Jacqueline Chadwick (née Pirie, born 10 October 1975) is a Scottish actress. She is best known for her roles in the British soap operas Emmerdale (1994–1996) and Coronation Street (1998–2001), playing Tina Dingle and Linda Sykes.

Early life
Born in Stirling, Scotland, Pirie moved with her family to Birmingham, England when she was five.

Acting career
She appeared in ITV soap opera Emmerdale, as Tina Dingle from 1994–1996. For this role she was nominated for Most Popular Actress at the 1996 National Television Awards. In 1994 Pirie played Mary in Culloden 1746. She next appeared in Coronation Street in 1998 as factory machinist Linda Sykes. The storyline involving her character's relationship with Mike Baldwin won Best Storyline at The British Soap Awards in 2001. She left Coronation Street in 2001 to pursue other interests.

Teaching
Since 2004, Jacqueline has been teaching drama and running her own performing arts workshop, the "Jacqueline Chadwick Academy of Performing Arts".

In 2007 she set up a drama school in her hometown of Stirling. She opened one of her drama schools in Campbell River, British Columbia, Canada, before moving it to Victoria, British Columbia, where she now resides.

Novels
Since leaving the Acting world, Jacqueline has been writing a highly acclaimed series of Thriller books.

 In The Still (Ali Dalglish Book 1) (2017) Fahrenheit Press
 Briefly Maiden (Ali Dalglish Book 2) (2019) Fahrenheit Press
 Silent Sisters (Ali Dalglish Book 3) (TBA) Fahrenheit Press

References

External links

 The Jacqueline Chadwick Academy

1975 births
Living people
Scottish soap opera actresses
Scottish television actresses